The Namibia men's cricket team toured the United Arab Emirates in February 2023 to play two One Day International (ODI) matches. The fixtures formed part of the 2019–2023 ICC Cricket World Cup League 2 tournament, and were arranged to make up for matches between the two sides that were previously postponed during the eighth round of the competition.

Squads

ODI series

1st ODI

2nd ODI

References

External links
 Series home at ESPNcricinfo

International cricket competitions in 2022–23
United Arab Emirates
2023 in Emirati cricket
2023 in Namibian cricket